In geometry, the hexagonal antiprism is the 4th in an infinite set of antiprisms formed by an even-numbered sequence of triangle sides closed by two polygon caps.

Antiprisms are similar to prisms except the bases are twisted relative to each other, and that the side faces are triangles, rather than quadrilaterals.

In the case of a regular 6-sided base, one usually considers the case where its copy is twisted by an angle . Extra regularity is obtained by the line connecting the base centers being perpendicular to the base planes, making it a right antiprism. As faces, it has the two  bases and, connecting those bases,  isosceles triangles.

If faces are all regular, it is a semiregular polyhedron.

Crossed antiprism
A crossed hexagonal antiprism is a star polyhedron, topologically identical to the convex hexagonal antiprism with the same vertex arrangement, but it can't be made uniform; the sides are isosceles triangles. Its vertex configuration is 3.3/2.3.6, with one triangle retrograde. It has D6d symmetry, order 24.

Related polyhedra
The hexagonal faces can be replaced by coplanar triangles, leading to a nonconvex polyhedron with 24 equilateral triangles.

External links 
 
 Hexagonal Antiprism: Interactive Polyhedron model
 Virtual Reality Polyhedra www.georgehart.com: The Encyclopedia of Polyhedra
 VRML model
 polyhedronisme A6

Prismatoid polyhedra